Chan-Byoung Chae is a Korean computer scientist, electrical engineer, and academic. He is an Underwood Distinguished Professor, the director of Intelligence Networking Laboratory, and head of the School of Integrated Technology at Yonsei University, Korea.

Chae has published over 200 papers and has been cited 11,000 times. He has 50 patents awarded in US and Europe. His research primarily focuses on the emerging technologies for 6G and molecular communications, with particular attention on nano-communications, MIMO communications, full duplex, and other advanced communications.

Chae is a Fellow of the Institute of Electrical and Electronics Engineers (IEEE), and editor-in-chief of IEEE Transactions on Molecular, Biological and Multi-Scale Communications. He serves as an editor for IEEE Communications Magazine, and IEEE Wireless Communications Letters and IEEE Transactions on Wireless Communications, and IEEE Journal on Selected Areas in Communications. He is also a member of the National Academy of Engineering of Korea.

Education
Chae graduated (ranked first) with a master's degree in electrical engineering from Korea Advanced Institute of Science and Technology (KAIST) in 2001. From 2005 till 2008, he was awarded Korea Government Fellowship for his Ph.D. Studies, and subsequently earned his doctoral degree in electrical and computer engineering in 2008 under the supervision of Robert W. Heath, Jr. From 2008 to 2009, he was a postdoctoral fellow and lecturer at Harvard University.

Career
Chae begin his academic career as a graduate research assistant at The University of Texas in October 2005. He was also appointed there as a teaching assistant and guest lecturer in 2007. In 2011, he joined Yonsei University, and has been serving there as an Underwood Distinguished Professor, as the director of Intelligence Networking Laboratory, and as head of the School of Integrated Technology since then. At Stanford University, he held appointment as a visiting professor in 2017.

Prior to joining UT, Chae was a research engineer at the Advanced Research Lab., the Telecommunications R&D Center,  in and Samsung Electronics, Suwon, Korea, from 2001 to 2005. While at Samsung, he participated in the IEEE 802.16e and 3GPP standardization, where he made several contributions and filed a number of related patents. He has also served as a member of technical staff (research scientist) at Bell Laboratories in Murray Hill, New Jersey, in US from 2009 to 2011.

Chae is an IEEE Fellow (nominated by ComSoc) and an IEEE ComSoc Distinguished Lecturer for the term 2020–203.

Research
Chae's research spans the fields of next generation (B5G/6G) communication networks, molecular communication networks, applied machine learning, and applied mathematics.

Communication networks
Chae discussed the applications of multi-user MIMO (MU-MIMO) networks in terms of revealing the unique opportunities arising from a joint optimization of antenna combining techniques with resource allocation protocols. He conducted a technology readiness analysis of molecular communication, highlighted the recent advancements in the field of MC engineering, and also demonstrated the biological, chemical, and physical processes used by an MC system. In 2008, he proposed a new joint optimization of linear transmit beamforming and highlighted combining vectors for the multiple-input multiple-output (MIMO) broadcast channel. Using Monte Carlo simulations, he evaluated the bit error rate and the sum rate performances of the proposed algorithm, and showed that the proposed method performs close to the sum capacity of the MIMO broadcast channel even with limited feedback. In another study, he proposed four detection algorithms, including adaptive thresholding, practical zero forcing with channel models excluding/including the ILI and ISI, and Genie-aided zero forcing.

While focusing on the vision of an XR-Aided Teleoperation System toward 5G/B5G, Chae presented the applications of extended reality (XR)-aided teleoperation in the context of improving operating efficiency in mission-critical, information-rich, and complex scenarios. He also proposed a mechanism to switch between multiple-input multiple-output (MIMO) with two transmit antennas and single-input multiple-output (SIMO) to conserve mobile terminals' energy. Extensive flow-level simulations under dynamic loads confirm that the proposed technique can reduce the transmission energy by more than 50% and enables an effective tradeoff between file transfer delay and energy conservation.

At Yonsei University, he developed a research program in wireless communications with a strong real-time prototyping component. One area of focus was on full-duplex wireless communications, where the transmitter and receiver at a device can use the same spectrum simultaneously. His group debuted a system on real-time full duplex radios at IEEE GLOBECOM 2014. His group developed and demonstrated more sophisticated full duplex MIMO strategies, reinforcement learning based flexible MIMO, wireless virtual reality (VR)/haptic MIMO and more at every following GLOBECOM till 2019. He received the Best Demo Award from IEEE DySPAN in 2018 for his demo system on OP-map based flexible duplex MIMO system.

He has also worked in new communication paradigm called molecular communications. He has been pioneering the development of molecular communication strategies, including theory and prototyping.

Machine learning
In 2017, Chae introduced a novel machine learning technique for modeling the molecular MIMO channel and confirmed its effectiveness using numerical studies. He also provided an overview of map-based mmWave channel models, and proposed a concept of how they can be utilized to integrate a hardware testbed/sounder with a software testbed/sounder. He categorized mapbased channel parameters and also provided guidelines for hybrid modeling. While focusing his studies on Artificial Intelligence (AI) and Machine Learning (ML) approaches, he addressed the special issues on advances and applications of artificial intelligence and machine learning for wireless communications. In another study, he employed the artificial neural networks technique, and modeled the received signal for a spherical transmitter and a perfectly absorbing receiver. while examining multiuser MIMO communication from an algorithmic perspective, he discussed performance gains, tradeoffs, and practical considerations, and also explored several approaches including non-linear and linear channelaware precoding in this context.

Awards and honors
2003 - Patent Prize, Samsung Electronics 
2004 - Outstanding Research Engineer, Samsung Electronics
2008 - IEEE-VTS Dan. E. Noble Fellowship Award
2012 - IEEE ComSoc AP Young Researcher Award 
2013 - Best Paper Award, IEEE Signal Processing Magazine 
2014 - Joined RF/Communications Lead User Program (the first in Asia)  
2014 - Real-Time Full Duplex LTE System Demo at IEEE Globecom 
2014 - IEIE/IEEE Joint Award for Young IT Engineer of the Year  
2015 - IEEE INFOCOM Best Demo Award 
2016 - Yonam Overseas Research Award, LG Yonam Foundation 
2017 - The Award of Excellence in Leadership of 100 Leading Core Technologies for Korea 2025, National Academy of Engineering of Korea 
2018 - Best Paper Award, IEEE/KICS Journal of Communications and Networks
2018 - IEEE DySPAN Best Demo Paper Award
2019 - Young Engineer Award, The National Academy of Engineering of Korea (NAEK)
2020 - Distinguished Lecturer (ComSoc), IEEE 
2020 - IEEE WCNC Best Demo Award
2020 - IEEE Fellow for contributions to MIMO design and prototype for emerging communication systems
2021 - Elected to the National Academy of Engineering of Korea
2021, 2018 - Best Multimedia Awards, IEEE Access
2021 - Best Educator Award, Outstanding Achievement Award in Education, Yonsei University (Hall of Fame)
2022 - IEEE ICC Best Demo Award
2022 - CES Innovation Award

Bibliography
Gesbert, D., Kountouris, M., Heath, R. W., Chae, C. B., & Salzer, T. (2007). Shifting the MIMO paradigm. IEEE signal processing magazine, 24(5), 36–46.
Chae, C. B., Tang, T., Heath, R. W., & Cho, S. (2008). MIMO relaying with linear processing for multiuser transmission in fixed relay networks. IEEE Transactions on Signal Processing, 56(2), 727-738.
Chae, C.-B. Mazzarese, D., Jindal, N., and Heath, R. W. (2008). Coordinated beamforming with limited feedback with limited feedback in the MIMO broadcast channel. IEEE Journal on Selected Areas in Communications, 26(8), 1505–1515.
Kim, N.-R. and Chae, C.-B. (2013). Novel modulation techniques using isomers as messenger molecules for nano communication networks via diffusion. IEEE Journal on Selected Areas in Communications, 31(12), 847-856
Yilmaz, H. B., Heren, A. C., Tugcu, T., & Chae, C. B. (2014). Three-dimensional channel characteristics for molecular communications with an absorbing receiver. IEEE Communications Letters, 18(6), 929–932.
Farsad, N., Yilmaz, H. B., Eckford, A., Chae, C. B., & Guo, W. (2016). A comprehensive survey of recent advancements in molecular communication. IEEE Communications Surveys & Tutorials, 18(3), 1887–1919.

References 

South Korean people
Computer scientists
Electrical engineers
University of Texas at Austin alumni
Academic staff of Yonsei University
Living people
1976 births